Nastaran Mohseni  born 1992 in Bandar Abbas, Iran is an Iranian film director and Cartoonist. She started her work by studying film making processes in IYCS (Iranian Youth Cinema Society) and she directed her first short film named "Galed" in 2017. She continues her work as a cartoonist by publishing her work in local newspaper and Social medias.

Biography
Mohseni graduated in Industrial engineering in 2014; and after that started her profession. She also works as an Illustrator and Graphic designer.

Personal life
Nastaran Mohseni got married with Iranian Director Shahab Abroshan in 2015.

Published
 The Cartoons of the year by Baban Publications (2016)
 Illustration of the local proverbs of Hormozgan (in Persian: Nooshkhandhaye Tamsil) (2019)

Filmography
 Galed (2017)
 Epidemic (2019)

Festivals
 20th International Youth Visual Arts Festival (2013)
 Tehran International Short Film Festival (2017)
 Khorshid national Short Film Festival (2017)
 Gambron Screenwriting festival (2017)
 COLORS: Cinema+ Diversidade (Curitiba/ Brazil) (2017)

Awards
She has received first fiction short screenplay awards from Gambron Screenwriting Festival for A Bullet in the fist in 2017.

See also
 Iranian women
 List of famous Persian women
 List of female film directors
 Women's cinema

References

1992 births
Living people
Iranian cartoonists
Iranian graphic designers
Iranian women film directors